Tenellia barbadiana is a species of sea slug, an aeolid nudibranch, a marine gastropod mollusk in the family Fionidae.

Distribution
This species was described from  depth on algae outside the Bellairs Research Institute, Barbados.

References 

Fionidae
Gastropods described in 1983